The men's 200 metres event at the 1988 World Junior Championships in Athletics was held in Sudbury, Ontario, Canada, at Laurentian University Stadium on 29 and 30 July.

Medalists

Results

Final
30 July
Wind: +4.2 m/s

Semifinals
29 July

Semifinal 1

Wind: +2.4 m/s

Semifinal 2

Wind: +2.0 m/s

Semifinal 3

Wind: +3.1 m/s

Heats
29 July

Heat 1

Wind: +1.7 m/s

Heat 2

Wind: +1.4 m/s

Heat 3

Wind: +1.5 m/s

Heat 4

Wind: +1.0 m/s

Heat 5

Wind: +0.9 m/s

Heat 6

Wind: +2.5 m/s

Heat 7

Wind: +0.7 m/s

Heat 8

Wind: +2.3 m/s

Participation
According to an unofficial count, 48 athletes from 36 countries participated in the event.

References

200 metres
200 metres at the World Athletics U20 Championships